Wick House may refer to:

in England
Wick House, Richmond Hill, designed by Sir William Chambers for Sir Joshua Reynolds
The Wick, Richmond, Surrey, currently owned by Pete Townshend

in the United States
Jockey Hollow, also known as Wick House

See also
 Wick (disambiguation)